Han Sanming (born 1971) is a Chinese actor and coal miner, known for his roles in films directed by his cousin Jia Zhangke. Initially, he was seen only in small roles or cameos, but was then cast in one of the lead roles, as a coal miner looking for his wife and daughter, in Still Life.  The film premiered at the 2006 Venice Film Festival and went on to win a Golden Lion award.

Of note, his characters are also named "Han Sanming" in the films.

Life
Han was born in 1971 in Hanjiayuan Village, Fenyang, Shanxi, the most coal-rich province in China. He became a coal miner after middle school. He has two brothers. He is the cousin of Jia Zhangke, director from Beijing Film Academy, a prestigious school that has nurtured some of China's top cinematic talent.

Filmography

Awards

References

External links
 
 Han Sanming Douban 

1971 births
Chinese male film actors
Living people
People from Lüliang